Kenneth Gordon McIntyre OBE, ComIH (22 August 191020 May 2004) was an Australian lawyer and historian.

Career
McIntyre was born in Geelong in 1910 and graduated from Geelong College as Dux of the School in 1926.   He went on to study Arts and Law at the University of Melbourne and on graduation taught at the University from 1931 to 1945.  In 1945 he left his teaching position and took on a legal practice in Box Hill, Melbourne and stood for mayor.  He won the election and took a special interest in housing cooperatives.  For his work as Mayor of Box Hill he was appointed an Officer of the Order of the British Empire in the 1962 New Year's Day Honours.

On retiring from public office in 1956, McIntyre returned to a passion for Portuguese history and undertook his main work on early Portuguese exploration of Australia.  After its publication in 1977, The Secret Discovery of Australia, which revived and expanded on earlier ideas about the possible Portuguese exploration and mapping of Australia in the sixteenth century, quickly became well known and contentious. The Portuguese Government awarded McIntyre the Commander of the Order of Prince Henry the Navigator in 1983 for his work in researching and publicising Portuguese exploration.

Following his death in 2004, McIntyre's family donated papers and documents, relating to the Portuguese voyages and the early mapping of the western Pacific, to the manuscript collection at the National Library of Australia.

McIntyre's interest in mathematics led him to develop a mathematical system for managing the playoff in what was then known as the Victorian Football League (VFL). The algorithm developed by McIntyre determined which teams would compete in the grand final.  Known as the McIntyre system, it was first implemented in the 1931 VFL season and a version of this system was used by the AFL until 2000.  The McIntyre final eight system was used by the Australian National Rugby League until 2011, after which it was scrapped by the Independent Commission and replaced with the current AFL finals system from the 2012 NRL season onwards.

Bibliography
 The Secret Discovery of Australia : Portuguese ventures 200 years before Captain Cook (Souvenir Press, 1977) 
 The Rebello transcripts : Governor Phillip's Portuguese prelude (Souvenir Press, 1984)

See also
 Theory of the Portuguese discovery of Australia
 Mahogany Ship

Notes

References
 Obituary in The Age 15 June 2004

External links
 

1910 births
2004 deaths
Mathematicians from Melbourne
Officers of the Order of the British Empire
University of Melbourne alumni
People from Geelong
European exploration of Australia
People educated at Geelong College
20th-century Australian historians
Pre-1606 contact with Australia
Pseudohistorians